Kala (Mandarin:卡拉乡) is a township in Muli Tibetan Autonomous County, Liangshan Yi Autonomous Prefecture, Sichuan, China. In 2010, Kala Township had a total population of 4,592: 2,558 males and 2,034 females: 917 aged under 14, 3,394 aged between 15 and 65 and 281 aged over 65.

References 
 

Township-level divisions of Sichuan
Liangshan Yi Autonomous Prefecture